Ishtixon District is a district of Samarqand Region in Uzbekistan. The capital is at the city Ishtixon.

The district consists of one city (Ishtixon), 12 urban-type settlements (Mitan, Azamat, Damariq, Bahrin, Qirqyigit, Odil, Sugʻot, Xalqobod, Shayxislom, Sheyxlar, Yangikent, Yangirabot) and 9 rural communities.

References 

Samarqand Region
Districts of Uzbekistan